Bill Murray is an American actor and comedian known for his collaborations with Harold Ramis, Sofia Coppola, Wes Anderson, and Jim Jarmusch. 

His roles with Harold Ramis include Caddyshack (1980), Stripes (1981), Ghostbusters (1984), Ghostbusters II (1989), and Groundhog Day (1993). For his collaboration with Sofia Coppola in Lost in Translation (2003) he received an Academy Award, British Academy Film Award, Golden Globe Award, and Screen Actors Guild Award nomination. He is also known for his performances in various films of Wes Anderson including Rushmore (1998) for which he received a Golden Globe Award nomination and a Independent Spirit Award.

Major Awards

Academy Awards

British Academy Film Awards

Golden Globe Awards

Independent Spirit Awards

Primetime Emmy Award

Screen Actors Guild Awards

Critics Awards

Alliance of Women Film Journalists EDA Awards

Boston Society of Film Critics Awards

Chicago Film Critics Association Awards

Columbus Film Critics Association Awards

Critics' Choice Movie Awards

Critics' Choice Television Awards

Dallas-Fort Worth Film Critics Association Awards

Denver Film Critics Society Awards

Detroit Film Critics Society Awards

Florida Film Critics Circle Awards

Greater Western New York Film Critics Association Awards

Houston Film Critics Society Awards

Iowa Film Critics Association Awards

Irish Film and Television Awards

Los Angeles Film Critics Association Awards

London Film Critics Circle Awards

Music City Film Critics Association Awards

National Society of Film Critics Awards

New York Film Critics Circle Awards

New York Film Critics Online Awards

North Carolina Film Critics Association Awards

North Texas Film Critics Association Awards

Online Film and Television Association Film Awards

Online Film and Television Association Television Awards

Online Film Critics Society Awards

Phoenix Film Critics Society Awards

San Diego Film Critics Society Awards

San Francisco Film Critics Circle Awards

Seattle Film Critics Awards

Seattle Film Critics Society Awards

Southeastern Film Critics Association Awards

St. Louis Film Critics Association Awards

Vancouver Film Critics Circle Awards

Washington D.C. Area Film Critics Association Awards

Miscellaneous Awards

American Comedy Awards

Blockbuster Entertainment Awards

Genie Awards

Gotham Independent Film Awards

International Cinephile Society Awards

Mark Twain Prize for American Humor

MTV Movie Awards

People's Choice Awards

Satellite Awards

Saturn Awards

Scream Awards

References 

Murray, Bill
Awards